Ezekiel 47 is the forty-seventh chapter of the Book of Ezekiel in the Hebrew Bible or the Old Testament of the Christian Bible.

This book contains the prophecies attributed to the prophet/priest Ezekiel, and is one of the Books of the Prophets. The final section of Ezekiel, chapters 40-48, gives the ideal picture of a new temple. The Jerusalem Bible refers to this section as "the Torah of Ezekiel".

This chapter contains Ezekiel's vision of the holy waters (Ezekiel 47:1-5) and their virtue (verses 6–12), the borders of the land (verses 13–21) and the division of the land by lot (verses 22–23). The vision was given on the 25th anniversary of Ezekiel's exile, "April 28, 573 BCE"; 14 years after the fall of Jerusalem and 12 years after the last messages of hope in chapter 39.

Text
The original text was written in the Hebrew language. This chapter is divided into 23 verses.

Textual witnesses

Some early manuscripts containing the text of this chapter in Hebrew are of the Masoretic Text tradition, which includes the Codex Cairensis (895), the Petersburg Codex of the Prophets (916), Aleppo Codex (10th century), Codex Leningradensis (1008).

There is also a translation into Koine Greek known as the Septuagint, made in the last few centuries BC. Extant ancient manuscripts of the Septuagint version include Codex Vaticanus (B; B; 4th century), Codex Alexandrinus (A; A; 5th century) and Codex Marchalianus (Q; Q; 6th century).

A life-giving torrent (47:1–12)
The portrayal of 'paradise regained' in this section concludes the original vision account, as Ezekiel from a location outside the eastern gate observes water flowing eastward from the temple complex, becoming a broad and swift-flowing stream that provides life for the barren dessert and sweetens the waters of the Dead Sea.

Verse 1

 Then he brought me back to the door of the temple; and there was water, flowing from under the threshold of the temple toward the east, for the front of the temple faced east; the water was flowing from under the right side of the temple, south of the altar.

Verse 8
Then he said to me: “This water flows toward the eastern region, goes down into the valley, and enters the sea. When it reaches the sea, its waters are healed.
The river flows into the River Jordan, to the east, and then into the Red Sea.

The boundaries of the land (47:13–23)

This section and the next chapter deal with the distribution of the land among the tribes of Israel, in a highly idealized scheme and with some place names that have not been identified with certainty.

Verse 13
 Thus says the Lord God:
 “These are the borders by which you shall divide the land as an inheritance among the twelve tribes of Israel.
 Joseph shall have two portions.”
 The vision of new Exodus and settlement received by Ezekiel is followed by the "new allotment of the land". The tribe of Levi (the priests) receives a land of its own, so the tribe of Joseph receive two portions to maintain a total of "twelve tribes".

See also

Related Bible parts: Psalm 46, Ezekiel 40, Ezekiel 43, Ezekiel 44, Ezekiel 45

Notes

References

Sources

External links

Jewish
Ezekiel 47 Hebrew with Parallel English
Ezekiel 47 Hebrew with Rashi's Commentary

Christian
Ezekiel 47 English Translation with Parallel Latin Vulgate

47